EVHS may refer to:

 Eagle Valley High School, in Gypsum, Colorado
 East Valley High School (disambiguation)
 Eastern View High School, in Culpeper, Virginia
 Eastview High School in Apple Valley, Minnesota
 Española Valley High School, in Española, New Mexico
 Evergreen Valley High School, in San Jose, California